Norape cana is a moth of the Megalopygidae family. It was described by Paul Dognin in 1907. It is found in Colombia.

References

Moths described in 1907
Megalopygidae